List of notable biologists from Slovenia

D 
 Dragotin Dežman (1821 - 1889)

G 
 Matija Gogala (b. 1937)
 Pavel Grošelj

H 
 Franc de Paula Hladnik (1773 - 1844)

K 
 Jožef Kalasanc Erberg (1771 - 1843)

M 
 Ernest Mayer (b. 1920)

P 
 Angela Piskernik (1886 - 1967)

R 
 Ivan Regen (1868 - 1947)

S 
 Giovanni Antonio Scopoli (1723 - 1788)
 Boris Sket

T 
 Kazimir Tarman (b. 1930)

Z 
 Miroslav Zei (1914-2006)

See also
 List of Slovenian botanists

 
Biologists
Slovenian